This is a list of Swedish gunboats.

1st class
  (1874)
 
  (1882)
  (1878)
  (1878)
  (1879)
  (1878)
 
  (1878)

2nd class
  (1862)
  (1861)
  (1861)
  (1860)
  (1862)
  (1856)
  (1862)
  (1860)
  (1862)
  (1856) 
  (1891) 
  (1850)

External links

Gunboats
Gunboats
Swedish Navy

sv:Lista över svenska ubåtar